Jung Pil-kyo (born November 27, 1979) is a South Korean singer-songwriter. He is best known as a member of the South Korean boy group Shinhwa. The main vocalist of Shinhwa, he debuted as a solo artist in 2005 and has since released multiple albums in both Korean and Japanese.

Biography

1998: Debut with Shinhwa

Shin auditioned in America through Brothers Entertainment and joined Shinhwa after bandmates Andy and Eric. He officially debuted as part of Shinhwa on March 24, 1998, with a performance of their first single "해결사" (The Solver) on KM Music Tank. Since then, he has released thirteen Korean and one Japanese studio albums with Shinhwa.

2005: Solo career
Shin debuted as a solo artist in 2005 with the release of his solo album entitled Love of May (오월지련, 五月之戀) in 2005.  This album ranked number one on the HMV pre-order sales chart in Japan in February 2005, with 180,000 copies sold.  Shin released his second album, entitled The Beginning, New Days on August 8, 2007. His song, "First Person", was No. 1 on the K-pop Top 10 chart. His album sold 30,000 copies on its first day of release and 50,000 copies in a week.

He has since released five Korean and two Japanese studio albums.

In June 2011, after releasing his fifth Korean studio album, The Road Not Taken, Shin wrapped up a series of performances in Seoul, Busan, and Shanghai. He also hosted a special two-day, 2011 Tour in Seoul – The Road Not Taken Act II, at Kyung Hee University on September 3 and 4. Then in July, he recorded a duet "I Believe," with Shunsuke Kiyokiba former member of Exile.

2012–present: Shinhwa comeback
In March 2012, Shin reunited with his Shinhwa bandmates for their comeback after four years, under the management of 'Shinhwa Company'. It is a joint venture agency for members to perform as a group, of which Eric and Lee Min-woo are co-CEOs and the remaining members are shareholders. The Company manages the group as a whole, whilst members' individual activities are managed by their respective agencies. The group released their tenth studio album The Return on March 23, 2012, launched their comeback concerts 2012 Shinhwa Grand Tour: The Return throughout Asia and their first exclusive variety program Shinhwa Broadcast premiered on March 17, 2012, on cable channel JTBC.

On March 25, during the encore performance of the 2012 Shinhwa Grand Tour in Seoul: The Return, Shin injured his knee. At the start of the performance of "Yo!", he was shot up on stage but did not land safely. He ruptured his cruciate ligament and severely damaged the cartilage and ligament surrounding the meniscus, requiring surgery and six weeks of rest. Shin had previously ruptured his cruciate ligament again, an injury previously sustained during a concert in 2001, and had corrective surgery on his left knee but the cruciate ligament in his right knee continued to suffer damage, for which he was exempt from mandatory military service. However, he has put off surgery, but has continued treatment through the end of promotional activities for Shinhwa's tenth studio album, The Return. He performed by singing in a chair for their first music show comeback on March 29 on M! Countdown, where they performed "Venus" and "Hurt".

In September Shin along with bandmate Lee Min-woo performed at the West Bank Music Festival in Shanghai from September 30 to October 2, as K-Pop representatives along with other international artists such as Michael Bolton in front of an audience of 100,000 people.

Discography

 2005: 五.月.之.戀 (Love of May)
 2007: The Beginning, New Days
 2008: Live and Let Live
 2009: Keep Leaves
 2010: Find Voice in Song
 2011: The Road Not Taken
 2011: Embrace
 2012: Winter Poetry
 2016: Delight
 2017: Serenity
 2019: Setlist

Compositions
 Shinhwa Vol. 2   "Forever With You (너의 곁에서)"
 Shinhwa Vol. 3   "Never Come To Me" (co-writer)
 Shinhwa Vol. 3   "Vortex"   (co-writer)
 Shinhwa Vol. 3   "Wedding March"
 Shinhwa Vol. 4   "Hey, Come On"
 Shinhwa Vol. 4   "Falling in Love"
 Shinhwa Vol. 4   "Sure I Know"
 Shinhwa Vol. 4   "바램 ( I Swear)"
 Shinhwa Vol. 6   " You (노을)"
 Shinhwa Vol. 7   "Oh"  (co-wrote song lyrics with Minwoo)
 Shinhwa Vol. 9   "Destiny of Love (흔적)"
 Shinhwa Vol. 10   "Let It Go" (co-wrote song lyrics with Eddie Shin)
 Shin Hye Sung Vol. 1   "Don't Leave" (co-writer with JPS)
 Shin Hye Sung Vol. 1   "Same Thought"  (co-writer with Park Chang Hyun)
 Shin Hye Sung Vol. 1   "Punishment (벌)"  (co-writer with Kim Do Hyun)
 Shin Hye Sung Vol. 1   "A Song For You"
 Shin Hye Sung Vol. 1   "After... "
 Shin Hye Sung & Lyn [He Said... She Said...]   "Echo"
 Group S Fr. in Cl   "I Swear"   (wrote English lyrics)
 Group S Fr. in Cl   "I Believe"
 S.E.S Vol. 1   "Good-Bye"  (Rap by Eric)
 S.E.S Vol. 2   "Kiss"   (Rap by Eric)

Other participation:  Shinhwa Vol. 8   "Midnight Girl" (New melody arrangements for ballad version)

Variety shows

Music shows
 2012 KBS Immortal Songs
 2013 MBC Remocon

Awards

References

External links

 Official Korean Website 
 Official Japanese Website 
 Shincom Entertainment Official Website 
 
https://www.instagram.com/delight.hs/ (in Korean)

1979 births
Living people
Shinhwa members
Tokuma Japan Communications artists
MAMA Award winners
South Korean male singers
South Korean male idols
South Korean J-pop singers
South Korean pop singers
Singers from Seoul